Duty: Memoirs of a Secretary at War is a nonfiction book written by Robert M. Gates, a former U.S. Secretary of Defense. It was published in January 2014 by Alfred A. Knopf. The time period is from 2006 to 2011, and includes the George W. Bush administration (2006–2009), the Obama administration (2009–2011), the Afghan war, and the Iraq War.

Narrated in first person point of view, this record of events characterizes Secretary Gates' personal interactions with the U.S. Congress, the Pentagon's management structure, some military bureaucrats and the White House staff under President Obama. This memoir is also the first to recount the Obama administration's policy discussions and debates during Cabinet meetings.

Gates's commentary
As expressed in the book, disagreements with Obama's White House staff and the other aforementioned organizations elicit strong emotions and criticisms from Gates. For example, President Obama's White House staff is seen as an imperious entity, who, as a group, are seen as "micromanagers" that engaged in "operational meddling". Additionally, Vice President Joe Biden's performance is criticized. Former Secretary of State Hillary Clinton's is held in high regard professionally and personally. She in fact was usually in agreement with Gates on policy issues.

President Obama is judged favorably at first, and not so favorably by 2011. However, towards the end of the book, Mr. Gates states that Mr. Obama's decision to send a United States Navy SEALs team after Osama Bin Laden in Pakistan was "one of the most courageous decisions I had ever witnessed in the White House". He also states that Obama's policy decisions pertaining to the "overall Afghan strategy" were correct. He also criticizes the George W. Bush administration's Afghan war, Iraq War, and Guantanamo Bay policies.

Gates's background
Gates came to the Obama Administration as a "respected professional and veteran of decades at the center of American foreign policy". As a Republican, he also represented President Obama's policy of bipartisanism. Over time, however, his relationship with Obama and his staff devolved. Protracted policy disagreements with Vice President Joe Biden, Tom Donilon (National Security Advisor), and U.S. Army Lieutenant General Douglas E. Lute (Afghan policy) are additionally recounted.

External links
 
  Jacket Copy section
 
 
 Robert Gates was wrong on the most important issue he ever faced. The Washington Post. January 7, 2014.
 Interview with Charlie Rose January 14, 2014.

References

American non-fiction books
American history books
American memoirs
Books about the Obama administration
United States foreign policy
Foreign policy of the Barack Obama administration
Presidency of George W. Bush
Presidency of Barack Obama
Political memoirs
Books about foreign relations of the United States
2000s in the United States
Military history of the United States
2010s in the United States